Eli is a 2015 Indian Tamil-language spy comedy written and directed by Yuvaraj Dhayalan. The film stars Vadivelu and Sadha. Vidyasagar composed the film's music. Eli, set in the 1960s, focuses on a small-time thief who is recruited by the police to infiltrate a gang in an effort to thwart an illegal cigarette smuggling scheme. The film was released on 19 June 2015 to negative reviews and became a box-office bomb.

Plot 

In 1960s Chennai (Madras then), a police officer and a social worker give speech about ban of cigarettes in All India Radio. Then three men get out from a car. They were thieves and were headed by Eli, a petty thief (who once aspired to become a police officer), who pretends to be a thief who has sold all his robbery items to a jewellery shop owner. The jewellery shop owner had no contact with him and his henchmen dressed as police take all the items pointed out and pretend to arrest Eli and loot the shop. He uses his tricks and loots many other places. One day he enters the house of retired police officer Mr. Rangarajan who had rejected him at the police selection. He loots everything except his photograph. When the current police I.G came there to meet Rangarajan, Eli pretends as though Rangarajan had vacated his house and he is performing rituals and not to disturb him. When the police officer meets Rangarajan on the way he is shocked to find that he had been tricked and Eli had looted the house.

Later when the police officer tells Rangarajan to send a police spy to catch the illegal cigarette cartel leader Nagaraj, Rangarajan recommends Eli to capture him. Eli pretends to be one of Nagaraj's henchmen and with the help of Julie captures Nagaraj red handed and hands him over to the police and also the policeman who had been helping Nagaraj.

Cast 

 Vadivelu as Elisamy a.k.a. "Eli" / Jolly
 Sadha as Julie
 Pradeep Rawat as Nagarajan
 Adithya as IG Mohanraj
 Santhana Bharathi as Jail Warden Ezhumalai
 Raj Kapoor as Police Inspector
 Rajendran as Kuruvi Manda Kumaru
 Kitty as Retired IG Rangarajan
 Bose Venkat as Inspector Karunakaran
 Besant Ravi as Kuruvi Manda Kumaru's brother
 Shanmugarajan
 Mahanadi Shankar as Padagu Babu
 Bava Lakshmanan as Eli's partner
 Vengal Rao as Eli's partner
 Nellai Siva
 King Kong as convict
 Muthukaalai as terrorist
 Boys Rajan as Padmanabhan
 Krishnamoorthy as Bank clerk
 Sakthivel as Jail warden
 Poochi Murugan as Minister Poochi Muthu
 Amirtha Lingam
 Pei Krishnan
 Kottai Perumal as smuggler
 Jayakumar as Police officer
 Aarivaya Shaik as Dumb convict
 Karnaa Radha

Production 
Eli is the second film of Vadivelu with Yuvaraj Dhayalan after Tenaliraman (2014). In March 2015, Sadha was confirmed to play the female lead in the film. Pradeep Rawat plays the film's antagonist. In an interview with Sudhir Srinivasan of The Hindu, Dhayalan said that the inspiration for the film's title came from the repeated usage of the word "rat", which is a term used to denote a spy, in the Martin Scorsese film The Departed (2006).

Principal photography commenced with the filming of a song sequence on the outskirts of the city, from the same day as the first look poster was released. The shooting is reported to continue for 60 days at a stretch. A stunt sequence was shot at a specially erected set in early April 2015 over a period of eight days. According to Dhayalan, this sequence features Vadivelu evading the villain's henchmen instead of fighting them.

Soundtrack 
Vidyasagar composed the film's soundtrack and score while Pulamaipithan and Viveka wrote the lyrics. The music rights were purchased by Saregama. The launch of the soundtrack was held on 11 May 2015. During the audio launch, Vadivelu revealed that the Hindi song "Mere Sapno Ki Rani" from Aradhana (1969) would be reused in the film and that the sequence would feature himself and Sadha.

Release 
On 5 February 2015, Elis first look poster was revealed. The poster featured Vadivelu sporting a red coat and yellow scarf over a black shirt and checked black trousers. The first trailer was released on 14 May 2015, while a second trailer was released on 4 June 2015. The film was released on 19 June the same month.

Critical reception 
Eli received generally negative reviews from critics. Baradwaj Rangan of The Hindu wrote, "There have been films...that have mined comedy from crime, but just about nothing works here. Eli is full of scenes that go on forever — and for no reason....Even Vadivelu is stranded — the gags he's in are shockingly weak." The Times of India's M. Suganth gave the film 1.5 stars out of 5, describing it as "overlong, dull and largely unfunny" and adding, "Yuvaraj Dhayalan, seems to be after a spoof of spy movies but the filmmaking has no comic rhythm and the script, which rehashes elements from movies as varied as Ragasiya Police 115 and The Departed, is too slack that scenes just go on for ever". The New Indian Express wrote, "An insipid screenplay and flat narration ensures that it would be the most tedious and boring 154 minutes one could have spent in a theatre...the film is a test of patience". Behindwoods concluded, "Vadivelu tries hard but Eli doesn't evoke enough laughter." Sify called Eli an "unmitigated disaster" and "probably the worst movie he (Vadivelu) has ever done as a hero". Raisa Nasreen of Bookmyshow commented positively on Vadivelu's performance but criticised the film's screenplay by stating that the scenes in the film were "too long and too predictable".

Box office 
Eli grossed  9,34,054 in Chennai during its opening weekend. It was a box-office bomb.

References

External links 
 

2010s crime comedy films
2010s spy comedy films
2010s Tamil-language films
2015 comedy films
2015 films
Cross-dressing in Indian films
Films scored by Vidyasagar
Films set in Chennai
Films set in the 1960s
Indian crime comedy films
Indian spy comedy films